is a Japanese sūtra of the Vajrayana school of Buddhism. Copied by the priest Hōrin in 686, it is the oldest hand-copied sūtra in Japan and is designated as a National Treasure. Hōrin based his copy on the original by Jñānagupta (523-600).

External links
Image of original sutra at Nara National Museum

References
 
 

National Treasures of Japan
Vajrayana
Buddhism in the Asuka period